Ali Mall is a shopping mall at the Araneta City in Cubao, Quezon City beside SM Cubao, and is owned by The Araneta City Inc. (ACI, Inc.), a subsidiary of the Araneta Group. Known as the first major shopping mall with integrated shopping in the Philippines, the mall was named in honor of boxer Muhammad Ali, and was built in 1976, making it one of the oldest malls in the country.

History 

Construction on the mall began in 1975 after Muhammad Ali's boxing victory against Joe Frazier in Araneta Coliseum, dubbed "Thrilla in Manila". At the time there were no malls in the country, until J. Amado Araneta's son, Jorge Araneta, a member of the Araneta family laid plans to build a mall and name it after Ali in honor of his victory. Ali was overjoyed with the proposal and did not charge any royalty fees. It was inaugurated on June 30, 1976, with Ali himself attending the ceremony.

The mall was designed by the architectural firm Sindiong-Ocampo, where Antonio S. Sindiong serves as the main architect and Lamberto Un Ocampo as the main engineer of the project, whom was also hired by Jorge L. Araneta to design the Farmers Plaza.  Ali Mall featured many firsts for the country, such as the first fully-enclosed integrated mall with multi-level covered parking garage, featuring a spiral driveway accessing all floors; the Alimall Cineplex 4, first cineplex with 2 cinemas, which was upgraded to 4 theatres; the largest indoor skating rink, known as Skate Town; and the first food court, presently known as the Food Plaza, with its first tenants being Papemelroti, Blue Magic, and Rusty Lopez.

During the 1980s, the mall underwent expansions and renovations, however, due to the political uncertainties due to the coup attempts against Corazon Aquino from the late 1980s, as well as market driven factors due to the fierce competition from constant rise of other large shopping malls within the 1990s to the 2000s, the mall gradually deteriorated. On October 2009, a new expansion to Ali Mall was opened and the renovation was completed in 2010. The ₱200 million renovation project consisted of a fully enclosed footbridge (Ali Mall Skywalk) that connected Ali Mall to nearby SM Cubao, to commemorate the friendship between the two malls. The renovation also featured new interiors, expanded sidewalks, and a modernization of the Ali Mall Cineplex 4. The mall also featured new revamped sections to cater market demands, such as the former Shoe Center, which opened its doors within the late 2000s, before closing it's doors in 2017 to be converted into the Food Lane, completed in early 2018.

In March 2019, a portion of the mall's upper ground floor was remodeled to cater novelty items, antiques, art, music, and memorabilia. This section was inaugurated as ALI X (Arts, Lifestyle, and Interests Experience), and "aims to be a haven for casual goers and hobbyists alike". Inaugural tenants included Happy Music, Remnant's Thrift Shop, and Erin's Artist's Lounge and Cafe, among others.

Features

The mall currently has  of retail spaces, and features environment-friendly air-conditioning and government services facilities. Among its tenants were Automatic Centre, Smart Communications, Globe Telecom, Philippine Airlines , Penshoppe, National Book Store, and more than 100 other shops, including dining, retail, and tech services shops. 

The mall also features the Ali Mall Cinemas and the Ali Mall Government Center at the third level, where various government offices occupy the area, such as the Department of Foreign Affairs (DFA) has a passport office located on the second level of the mall and opened its doors in February 2014. Following the opening of the DFA office, more government agencies began occupying the Government Center area, located at the mall's second floor and is occupied by Pag-IBIG Fund, the National Bureau of Investigation, the Land Transportation Office, Philippine Postal Corporation, the Food and Drug Administration, the Department of Trade and Industry, the QC Business Center, and the Barangay Socorro Satellite Office. 

The mall also features an events hall atrium at the lower ground floor, and a glass painting of Muhammad Ali, located within the atrium at the mall's ground floor.

Popular culture
The mall is referenced in Gina Apostol's novel, Insurrecto.

See also 
Araneta City
Smart Araneta Coliseum
Gateway Mall

References

External links

Buildings and structures in Quezon City
Shopping malls in Quezon City
Shopping malls established in 1976
Muhammad Ali
1976 establishments in the Philippines